Battlesbridge railway station is on the Crouch Valley Line in the East of England, serving the village of Battlesbridge, Essex. The Engineer's Line Reference for the line is WIS; the station's three-letter station code is BLB.

The line and station were opened on 1 June 1889 for goods and on 1 October 1889 for passenger services by the Great Eastern Railway. The station had a single platform with a station building, a goods shed, a goods yard including cattle pens, and a 34-lever signal box. The freight service was withdrawn on 4 October 1965; the goods loop and signal box were closed on 7 December 1966. All the station buildings were demolished in 1968. Electrification of the Wickford to Southminster line using 25 kV overhead line electrification (OLE) was completed on 12 May 1986.

Battlesbridge station is currently managed by Greater Anglia, which also operates all trains serving it. Since the platform is only long enough to accommodate eight carriages, any peak-hour trains formed of 12 coaches do not call at Battlesbridge.

References

External links

History of the Crouch Valley Line 
Local information about Crouch Valley Line

Railway stations in Essex
DfT Category F2 stations
Former Great Eastern Railway stations
Greater Anglia franchise railway stations
Railway stations in Great Britain opened in 1889
William Neville Ashbee railway stations